Dr. Abdul Raziq Kakar is an Animal Scientist by profession and a proud member of a livestock rearing community. He belongs to the historical pasturelands of the Arya Warsha (situated partially in Pakistan and Afghanistan now) and has great roots in animal agriculture. He worked as a professor and dean of the faculty of veterinary and animal sciences at the Lasbela University of Agriculture, Water & Marine Science (2012 - 2014). Dr. Abdul Raziq is the founder of World Camel Day and World Donkey Day. He is the founder of the Camel Association of Pakistan (CAP). He is the head of Camel4Life International (an advocacy forum promoting camel as a food security animal under the climate change scenario), having almost 300 members from all over the world.

Educational background 
 Primary Education from Government High School Loralai
 Secondary Education from Government Inter College Loralai" and “University of Balochistan, Quetta.”
 Graduated in Animal husbandry at University of Agriculture Faisalabad, Pakistan
 Doctorate in Animal Science at the University of, Agriculture Faislabad
 Studied Characterization, Documentation, and Reporting of Livestock Breeds from Zaragoza University Spain.
 M.Phil. in Animal Nutrition and Feed Technology at the University of Veterinary and Animal Sciences.

Work history 
 Working as Technical Manager at '''‎Al Ain Farms – مزارع     العين Performing as International Consultant of Camel Dairying Professor and Dean, Faculty of Vet. and Animal Sciences at Lasbela University of Agriculture, Water & Marine Science''

Contributions 
 Camel, especially camel milk
 Founder of World Camel Day and World Donkey Day.
 Traditional livestock breed with special emphasis on their role in livelihood and food security under the climate change crisis.
 Ethnoecology includes ethnobotany, drylands’ flora, revitalization of drylands with livestock grazing, documentation of traditional knowledge.
 Drylands and the desert.

References 

Living people
Male veterinarians